Sully Creek may refer to:

Sully Creek (South Dakota)
Sully Creek State Park, a state park in North Dakota